Fedja Erik Allan Anzelewsky (17 March 1919, Nordhausen – 18 May 2010, Berlin) was a German art historian, best known for his internationally recognised monographs on Albrecht Dürer.

Works
 Miniaturen aus der Toggenburg-Chronik aus dem Jahre 1411. Klein, Baden-Baden 1960.
 Miniaturen aus deutschen Handschriften. Klein, Baden-Baden 1961.
 Dürer und seine Zeit. Meisterzeichnungen aus dem Berliner Kupferstichkabinett. Ausstellungskatalog. Staatliche Museen Preußischer Kulturbesitz, Berlin 1967.
 Albrecht Dürer. Das malerische werk. Deutscher Verlag für Kunstwissenschaft, Berlin(-West) 1971, . Neuausgabe: Albrecht Dürer. Das malerische Werk. Band 1: Tafelband. Band 2: Textband. Deutscher Verlag für Kunstwissenschaft, Berlin 1991, .
 Dürer. Werk und Wirkung. Electa-Klett-Cotta, Stuttgart 1980, .
 Grünewald. Das Gesamtwerk. Ullstein, Frankfurt 1980, 
Die großen Meister der Malerei.
 Dürer-Studien. Untersuchungen zu den ikonographischen und geistesgeschichtlichen Grundlagen seiner Werke zwischen den beiden Italienreisen. Deutscher Verlag für Kunstwissenschaft, Berlin 1983, .

References

External links
Publications

1919 births
2010 deaths
German art historians
Albrecht Dürer